Ulfcytel Snillingr, or Snylling, (died 1016) was an Anglo-Saxon nobleman. He was apparently the ealdorman of East Anglia from 1004 to his death at the Battle of Ashingdon in 1016, although he is not called an ealdorman in any of the charters he witnessed. Scandinavian sources refer to him as Ulfkell Snillingr, the byname meaning bold.

Background and status

Leofsige, ealdorman of Essex, was exiled for killing a shire reeve in 1002. It is not certain that any ealdorman was appointed by King Æthelred the Unready to replace Leofsige, although John of Worcester's chronicle calls Ulfcytel the dux—war leader—of the East Anglians, and he appears as leader of the East Anglians on several occasions.

It may be that Ulfcytel was married to a daughter of King Æthelred (by his first wife) named Wulfhild, as suggested by a supplementary text to the Jómsvíkinga saga. From 1004 onwards he witnessed a large number of King Æthelred's charters, being described in these as a minister, that is thegn, rather than an ealdorman.

Ulfcytel's name is of Scandinavian origin, but no details of his family are known. It is possible that he was in some way related to the family or affinity of Æthelstan Half-King which had dominated politics in East Anglia and Essex from the 930s to the 990s. In addition to the English sources, Ulfcytel also appears as a character in Saint Olaf's saga in the Heimskringla, and here East Anglia is called "Ulfcytel's land".

Military career 1004-1016

In 1004 the Anglo-Saxon Chronicle reports a bloody battle between the East Anglians and an army led by Danish king Swein Forkbeard. The Chronicle states that Ulfcytel and the "councillors in East Anglia" attempted to buy a truce with Swein, but that the Danes broke the truce and marched to Thetford where a part of the East Anglian fyrd engaged them. The battle seems to have been a draw as the Danes managed to escape. Two of the Chronicle manuscripts state that the Danes later "admitted that they had never met with harder hand-play [fighting] in England than Ulfcytel gave them". The Danes suffered heavy losses, and were probably only saved from destruction because Ulfcytel's order to destroy their ships was not carried out. They left England without causing any further devastation which has been recorded.

On his next appearance in the Chronicle again Ulfyctel is portrayed as the leader of the East Anglian armies. On this occasion the Battle of Ringmere against the Danes near Ipswich in 1010 turned into a rout, caused by the flight of Thurcytel "Mare's head", and only the men of Cambridgeshire stood to fight. The English dead included the King's brother-in-law, the son-in-law and grandson of ealdorman Byrhtnoth, "and countless people".

Ulfcytel's third and last appearance in the Anglo-Saxon Chronicle is at the battle of Assandun on 18 October 1016 where he fought for Edmund Ironside. Here he was killed; he is listed among "the chief men of the nation" by the Chronicle. According to one Scandinavian source he was killed by Thorkell the Tall, who married his widow. Thorkell may well have married one of Æthelred's widowed daughters although it is far from certain that he married Wulfhild. Alternatively, and less plausibly, Saint Olaf's Saga states that Ulfcytel was killed by Eiríkr Hákonarson near London.

Notes

References
 
 Fryde, E. et al. Handbook of British Chronology. 3d ed. Cambridge, 1996.
 Henson, Donald, A Guide to Late Anglo-Saxon England: From Ælfred to Eadgar II. Anglo-Saxon Books, 1998. 
 Higham, Nick, The Death of Anglo-Saxon England. Sutton, 1997. 
 Stafford, Pauline, Unification and Conquest: A Political and Social History of England in the Tenth and Eleventh Centuries. London: Edward Arnold, 1989. 
 Swanton, Michael, The Anglo-Saxon Chronicle. New York: Routledge, 1998. 

10th-century births
1016 deaths
Earls and ealdormen of East Anglia
Anglo-Saxons killed in battle
Anglo-Saxon warriors